The National Auto Sport Association (NASA) is an American motorsports organization promoting road racing and high-performance driver education.

Founded in 1991, NASA hosts High Performance Driving Events (HPDE), automotive rallies, Time Trial, autocross and amateur, club-level automotive racing, divided amongst regionally based chapters within the United States.

In September 2006, NASA held its first-ever National Championships at Mid-Ohio.  The NASA National Championships are open to any driver who earns points in a minimum of five regional races (in any NASA region or combination of regions).

Since 2021, the NASA National Championships have been held at Daytona International Speedway.

Time trial
Racing in the time trial classes allows drivers to compete against each other for the fastest lap. It is currently NASA's mid-level offering, fitting between the HPDE and road racing series.

Competitive racing
NASA currently offers the following Road Racing series:
 944 Spec
 American Iron Racing
 American Iron Extreme
 Camaro Mustang Challenge
 Endurance Racing
 German Touring Series
 Honda Challenge
 NASA Prototype
 NASA Rally Sport
 Spec3
 Spec E30
 Spec E46
 Spec Iron
 Spec Miata
 Spec Z
 Super Touring/Super Unlimited
 Thunder Roadster
 Team Racing Endurance Challenge (TREC)

Other sanctioned competition series

 25 Hours of Thunderhill
 HyperFest: The Automotive Amusement Park
 One Lap of America
 NASA Rally Sport
 Teen Mazda Challenge
 United States Touring Car Championship

NASA regions

 Arizona
 NorCal
 SoCal
 MidAmerica
 Florida
 Great Lakes
 Hawaii
 Mid-Atlantic
 Mid South
 NOLA
 Northeast
 Rally Sport
 Rocky Mountain
 Southeast
 Texas Region
 Utah

References

External links
Official Website
National Championships Website
Official Discussion Forums
NASA Time-Trial
NASA Rally Sport
How to Build a Mustang Race Car for NASA American Iron

Auto racing organizations in the United States
Sports car racing
Auto racing series in the United States